Bogdan Adamczyk (born 27 November 1935) is a former Polish footballer. Adamczyk spent the majority of his career playing for Lechia Gdańsk, with the exceptions of playing two seasons with Zawisza Bydgoszcz, and two years in Australia playing for Polonia Sydney.

Senior career 

In 1954 Adamczyk made his Lechia debut against Górnik Zabrze, in the first game of the season.  In his second professional season Adamczyk was playing in the top flight with Lechia, and was playing regularly for the team. He scored his first Ekstraklasa goal against Wisła Kraków, his third game of playing in the highest division. From 1956-57 Adamczyk was called up for his military service, and as a result spent those two years playing for Zawisza Bydgoszcz, a team which started as a military sponsored sports club.

In 1958 Adamczyk returned to Lechia and found himself back in the starting team. In his first year back he scored a total of 11 goals making him the clubs top scorer, and was his highest tally in the top division in a single season.  In 1962 Adamczyk played his 100th game in the Ekstraklasa, an occasion with which he scored a goal for Lechia. 

Adamczyk's goals were not enough to keep Lechia in the top division, and within a few years Lechia found themselves playing in the third tier.  It was at this time Adamczyk decided to leave Lechia, with whom he had played 117 games and scoring 36 goals in the Ekstraklasa for Lechia. Adamczyk was Lechia's highest goalscorer in the Ekstraklasa until Flávio Paixão broke his record in 2018.

In 1965 Adamczyk moved to Sydney, Australia, to play for Polonia Sydney. A team that started in Sydney from Polish immigrants. Adamczyk finally retired from football in 1967 having played in Australia for 2 years.

Awards
 2011: Gold Cross of Merit, for achievements in football and its popularization

References

1935 births
Lechia Gdańsk players
Polish footballers
People from Radom
Association football forwards
Living people